Skills Development Scotland (SDS) is the national skills agency of Scotland. It is an executive non-departmental public body of the Scottish Government.

History
Created on 1 April 2008, SDS is a merger of former organisations and services which delivered skills related services across Scotland.

The former organisations or services that now make up SDS are:

  Careers Scotland
  Elements of Scottish Enterprise's skills function
  Elements of Highlands & Islands Enterprise's skills function
  Scottish University for Industry (learndirect Scotland, learndirect Scotland for business, ILA Scotland and The Big Plus)
  Training for Work
  Skillseekers
  Modern Apprenticeships

In 2010, the agency found itself facing funding cuts of more than £20million and needing to find 125 voluntary redundancies, one tenth of its workforce.

Structure
Skills Development Scotland has a presence in most major towns across Scotland.

The Big Plus
The Big Plus is an awareness raising campaign in Scotland targeting adults who might be unable to achieve their aspirations due to a lack of literacy and/or numeracy skills. Formerly part of the Scottish University for Industry, it is now part of Skills Development Scotland.

Adults who respond to the media promotion are put in touch with a local learning provider where they are invited to participate in a program of personal, dedicated learning activities at a local centre. The program aims to help participants reach a level of skills that will enable them to actively engage, with confidence, in personal, family, community and work life. Learning programs are provided by Scottish local authorities and are free to resident applicants.

References

External links

The Big Plus

2008 establishments in Scotland
Career and technical education
Business in Scotland
Executive non-departmental public bodies of the Scottish Government
Government agencies established in 2008
Organisations based in Glasgow
Training organizations